Mahongwe is an undocumented and threatened Bantu language spoken in Gabon.

References

Kele languages